Steinar Sivertsen  (born 1941) is a Norwegian schoolteacher and literary critic. He graduated from the University of Oslo in 1971 as cand.philol. with a thesis on the poetry of Harald Sverdrup, and was appointed teacher at the Stavanger Cathedral School from 1973 to 2005.

He was a literary critic for the newspaper Rogalands Avis from 1975 to 1992, and for Stavanger Aftenblad since 1992, and has written more than 2000 critics since he started in 1975.

He received the Norwegian Literature Critics Award for 2009.

References

1941 births
Living people
University of Oslo alumni
Norwegian schoolteachers
Norwegian literary critics
People from Stavanger
20th-century Norwegian male writers
21st-century Norwegian male writers